Mykhailo Riaby (born May 9, 1983) is a Ukrainian former footballer who played as a midfielder.

Playing career 
Riaby began his career in the Ukrainian Football Amateur League in 2001/2002 with FC Bukovina Chernovtsi. In 2004, he played with FC Dnister Zalishchyky, and in 2007 played in the professional ranks with FSC Bukovyna Chernivtsi in the Ukrainian Second League. The following season he spent time in the Ukrainian First League with Nyva Ternopil. He later played abroad in the III liga with Polonia Przemyśl for two separate occasions in 2010-12, and in 2014. In 2013, he returned home to spend time with FC Karpaty Kolomyia, and FC Dnister Zalishchyky.

In 2016, he helped his former club PFC Nyva Ternopil secure promotion to the Ukrainian Second League, and played with Nyva Terebovlya for the remainder of the season. He went abroad for the third time in 2017 to play in the Canadian Soccer League with FC Vorkuta, where in his debut season assisted in clinching the First Division title. In his second season with Vorkuta he assisted in securing the club's first CSL Championship.

Honors 
FC Vorkuta

 CSL Championship: 2018
 Canadian Soccer League First Division: 2017, 2019

References 

Living people
1983 births
Ukrainian footballers
FC Dnister Zalishchyky players
FC Bukovyna Chernivtsi players
FC Nyva Ternopil players
FC Continentals players
Ukrainian First League players
Canadian Soccer League (1998–present) players
Association football midfielders
Ukrainian expatriate sportspeople in Canada
Ukrainian expatriate footballers
Expatriate soccer players in Canada
Ukrainian Second League players
III liga players
Sportspeople from Chernivtsi Oblast